Zena, Oregon is a former community (now considered a ghost town) approximately  northwest of Salem, Oregon, United States, in Polk County. The community was established in 1858, originally called "Spring Valley". It was renamed "Zena" by Daniel Jackson Cooper and his brother Jacob Calvin Cooper, pioneers from Missouri. In 1866, they built a store and located the post office there, renaming the community in tribute to their wives (and sisters), Arvazena Spilman Cooper and Melzena Spilman Cooper. Zena is home to the historic Spring Valley Presbyterian Church. The 1992 novel, The Road to Zena by Joel Redon, is set in Zena and nearby Lincoln.

Arvazena Cooper
Arvazena was born in 1846 in Cherokee County, North Carolina. She spent many years in Missouri and married Daniel Jackson Cooper in May 1861. Two years later, the family moved west and settled in Oregon's Willamette Valley. She and her husband had 15 children born in Missouri, Oregon and on the journey to Oregon. Arvazena died in 1929 and is buried in The Dalles, Oregon.

According to Arvazena Cooper:

Grandpa [Elbert Emmerson Cooper] went over into Polk County during this week and got a place to stop at from Bolivar Walker.  Afterward he bought a place from Nels Walling, paying for it with his outfit he crossed the plains with.  It was at a place afterwards called Zena, near a church where Grandpa preached for several years."

See also
John Phillips House
List of ghost towns in Oregon
Spring Valley (Oregon)

References

Further reading
Seven brothers and three sisters: Oregon children and descendants of Elder E.E. and Nancy Cooper.  by J C Cooper; M P Cooper. McMinnville, Or.: J.C. & M.P. Cooper, 1913

External links
Historic photographs of Zena from Salem Public Library
Guide to the A.A. Cooper Collection at the University of Kansas

Ghost towns in Oregon
Salem, Oregon metropolitan area
Former populated places in Polk County, Oregon
1858 establishments in Oregon Territory